Severe Tropical Cyclone Ivy (Fiji Meteorological Service designation: 05F, Joint Typhoon Warning Center designation: 13P) was a tropical cyclone that affected about 25% of the population of Vanuatu in February 2004. It was first classified as a tropical disturbance on February 21 between Vanuatu and Fiji. The system tracked northwestward, gradually organizing and intensifying. After attaining tropical storm status on February 23, Ivy strengthened more quickly as it turned southwestward toward Vanuatu. It attained peak winds of  while moving over Vanuatu, making it an intense Category 4 cyclone on the Australian Region Tropical Cyclone Intensity Scale. By the time it passed through Vanuatu, Ivy had turned southeastward, and it gradually weakened while accelerating. After becoming extratropical on February 28, it passed just east of New Zealand and eventually dissipated on March 2.

The third significant cyclone in 14 months to affect the region, Ivy produced heavy rainfall and high winds in Vanuatu. Due to advance warning, only two people were killed, and several people were injured. The high winds damaged about 11,000 houses, leaving many people homeless. The cyclone passed very close to the Vanuatu capital city of Port Vila, forcing the evacuation of about 2,000 people and shutting down the main port. Cyclone Ivy also affected the Solomon Islands and New Caledonia with rainfall, and later it produced high waves in New Zealand that killed two people. Because of its severe damage on Vanuatu, the name Ivy was retired following its usage.

Meteorological history

In the middle of February 2004, a monsoon trough formed in the southwest Pacific Ocean during the middle of a Madden–Julian oscillation pulse. A low-pressure area developed along the trough, and the Fiji Meteorological Service (FMS) designated it Tropical Disturbance 5F on February 21 about halfway between Vanuatu and Fiji. Initially, the system was moving little and had a circulation that was detached from the primary area of convection. On February 22 after the thunderstorms increased, the Joint Typhoon Warning Center (JTWC) initiated advisories on the disturbance with the designation Tropical Cyclone 13P. Shortly thereafter, the FMS reported that the disturbance developed into a tropical depression, although the convection was transient and displaced from the circulation. The system tracked west-northwestward, due to a ridge located to its south. With low wind shear and good outflow, the system gradually organized, with the circulation becoming situated underneath the convection.

After being named, Ivy quickly intensified after its convection was drawn into the circulation. Late on February 23, the JTWC upgraded Ivy to the equivalent of a Category 1 hurricane on the Saffir–Simpson scale, and the FMS followed suit the following day by upgrading Ivy to a severe tropical cyclone as continued favourable conditions allowed for rapid deepening. On February 24 the cyclone began a turn to the southwest as it moved around the ridge, and the next day it turned to the south toward Vanuatu as an approaching shortwave trough passed to the south and created a weakness in the ridge. A nearby upper-level low temporarily cut off outflow, although once it moved further away the low enhanced ventilation.

After passing slowly through Vanuatu, Ivy began accelerating to the southeast and its eye passed very close to the capital city of Port Vila, after moving over the island of Epi. As the cyclone moved away from the island group, it underwent an eyewall replacement cycle. In addition, the combination of cooler water temperatures, greater wind shear, less outflow, and land interaction with Vanuatu caused gradual weakening. Late on February 27, Ivy entered the area of warning responsibility of New Zealand's MetService. The convection rapidly diminished and left the circulation exposed, and Ivy transitioned into an extratropical cyclone on February 28. It remained strong and maintained a well-defined circulation as it passed just east of East Cape, New Zealand.

Preparations and impact

While Ivy was reaching peak intensity, it passed through Vanuatu, becoming the third major cyclone in 14 months to affect the region, after Cyclone Zoe and Cyclone Gina. Its threat prompted over 2,000 people in Port Vila to evacuate. In addition, the cyclone dropped heavy rainfall, reaching  at Bauerfield International Airport in Port Vila. The central area of deep convection moved across every island in the archipelago.

As the cyclone moved through Vanuatu, it cut off communications between the various islands, and also knocked Radio Vanuatu offline. Overall there was widespread moderate damage, with small areas of heavier damage. The cyclone affected more than 54,000 people – about 25% of the population – on various islands, including Paama, Epi, Ambrym, eastern Malekula, northern Aoba, and northern Maewo. On Ambrym island, the winds wrecked the roofs of houses and downed trees and vegetables. Overall, about 11,000 houses were damaged, and a large proportion of the 24,000 people in Ivy's path became homeless due to the destruction of their houses, with many buildings made of iron and bamboo wrecked. In addition, the winds downed trees and power lines.

Heavy damage occurred in the capital city of Port Vila, where flooding washed out small bridges. Strong waves wrecked the main port there and also capsized two boats.  High winds downed trees and blocked roads across the capital, with 70% of the nation's roads affected. Several people were injured due to flying debris, and one person was severely injured due to the storm. The high winds affected 80% of the nation's food crops, including the loss of much of the mango and banana crops as well as the ruination of about 75% of the coconut and cocoa crops. The latter loss was significant due to its status as a cash crop. The cyclone damaged 90% of the water facilities across the archipelago. It also damaged about 60% of the health centers, as well as 112 schools, some of which were completely destroyed. Monetary damage was estimated at VT427.6 million (2004 VUV, $3.8 million 2004 USD). Due to advance warning, there were only two deaths in Vanuatu, including one when a landslide killed a woman on Malakula island.

In addition to affecting Vanuatu, Ivy produced heavy rainfall in Tikopia and Anuta, two small islands in the southeastern Solomon Islands. Later, intense rainbands spread across the Loyalty Islands in New Caledonia. Along the Bay of Plenty in New Zealand, the extratropical remnants of Ivy produced high waves that killed two people in Whakatane. Wind gusts reached  at the Whakatane Airport, and the combination of winds and waves produced beach erosion along the coast.

Aftermath
The local Red Cross offices in Port Vila and Luganville prepared general relief supplies before the storm's arrival, including tents, tool kits, and first aid units. By four days after the cyclone's passage, the main wharf in Port Vila was re-opened and the two sunken boats were removed. Additionally, the evacuees were allowed to return to their homes, and communications between the various islands were restored. The Red Cross distributed various relief supplies to the affected citizens, including candles, matches, water, and blankets. By about two weeks after the storm, about 30,000 household relief packages were distributed. The Vanuatu government allocated VT25 million (2004 VUV, $236,000 2004 USD) for the affected citizens. Overall, the cyclone severely affected the daily lives of the Vanuatu citizens. On Tanna island, the cyclone's passage produced a malaria outbreak.

In the immediate aftermath, the New Zealand Red Cross provided $10,000 (2004 NZD) for essential relief supplies. In addition, the New Zealand government provided $70,000 for assistance in the most affected areas, after the country's Air Force dispatched a plane over Vanuatu to determine the extent of damage. The Government of Australia similarly sent a helicopter reconnaissance mission to determine damage, as well as two planes with $200,000 (2004 AUD) in relief supplies, including 2,400 tarps, 2,600 water containers, and 5,200 packets of water purification tablets. The French government also sent a helicopter and assistance as per the 1992 FRANZ Agreement between New Zealand, Australia, and France.

Due to the severity of damage wrought by the cyclone, the World Meteorological Organization retired the name Ivy following its usage and replaced it with Irene. Ivy was retired along with earlier Cyclone Heta; the two were the only named storms to form within the basin that season.

See also

List of retired South Pacific tropical cyclone names

References

External links

2003–04 South Pacific cyclone season
Tropical cyclones in Vanuatu
Tropical cyclones in New Zealand
Category 4 South Pacific cyclones
Tropical cyclones in the Solomon Islands
Retired South Pacific cyclones
Tropical cyclones in 2004